The 1972 United States Senate election in Kentucky took place on November 7, 1972. Incumbent Republican Senator John Sherman Cooper retired, and Democratic State Senator Walter Dee Huddleston narrowly won the open seat over former Republican Governor Louie Nunn.

Democratic primary

Candidates
Willis V. Johnson
Sandy Hockensmith
Walter Dee Huddleston, State Senator from Elizabethtown
Charles Van Winkle
James E. Wallace

Results

Republican primary

Candidates
W. Howard Clay
Robert E. Gable, businessman and Commissioner of State Parks of Kentucky
Thurman Jerome Hamlin, perennial candidate from London
Louie Nunn, former Governor of Kentucky (1967–71)
George Wooton

Results

General election

Results

See also
1972 United States Senate elections

References 

1972
Kentucky
United States Senate